The 2010–11 Liga Panameña de Fútbol season is the 23rd season of top-flight football in Panama. Because of a restructuring of the calendar of the season, this season will contain three tournaments to bring the season to a fall-spring season (similar to the majority of leagues in Europe). The season began on January 15, 2010, and is scheduled to end in May 2011. Ten teams will complete throughout the entire season.

Teams

Managerial changes

2010 Clausura

The 2010 Clausura was the first tournament of the season. It began on January 25, 2010, and ended on May 14, 2010. Árabe Unido were crowned the champion after defeating San Francisco 1–0 in the first professional football match played in the newly remodeled Estadio Rommel Fernández. This was Arabe's 2nd title in a row and its sixth in its history. After clinching this win Árabe Unido earned the Panama 1 spot in the 2010–11 CONCACAF Champions League and Tauro the Panama 2 spot as the runner-up with the most points in the 2009 Apertura II and 2010 Clausura season. San Francisco obtained the Panama 3 spot after Belize Premier Football League champion failed to meet the CONCACAF stadium requirements, thus the vacated spot was awarded to Panama's runner-up with less points.

First round

Standings

Results

Final round

Semifinals
Semifinal 1

Semifinal 2

Final

Top goalscorers

2010 Apertura

The 2010 Apertura was the second tournament of the season and it began on 30 July 30, 2010 and ended on 17 December 2010.

First round

Standings

Results

Final round

Semifinals
Semifinal 1

Semifinal 2

Final

Top goalscorers

2011 Clausura

The 2011 Clausura was the third and final tournament of the season. It began on 28 January 2011 and ended on 14 May 2011.

First round

Standings

Positions by round

Results

Final round

Semifinals
Semifinal 1

Semifinal 2

Final

Top goalscorers

Aggregate table

References

Liga Panameña de Fútbol seasons
1
Pan

fr:Tournoi de clôture du championnat du Panamá de football 2011